Taylor Bertolet (born October 24, 1992) is an American football placekicker who is a free agent. He played college football at Texas A&M and holds a school record for most extra points in a single season.

College career 
In 2012, Bertolet and quarterback Johnny Manziel became the first freshmen to surpass 100 points in a season. Bertolet kicked for a total of a career-high 106 points including 13 field goals and a school record 67 extra points. Bertolet kicked a season-long 54-yard field goal against Louisiana Tech.

Bertolet was mainly the Aggies kickoff specialist for the 2013 and 2014 season, losing placekicking job to Josh Lambo.

In 2015, Bertolet kicked a career-high 22 field goals on 31 attempts for a career-high 71% field goal percentage. Bertolet kicked a career-long 55-yard field goal against Mississippi State. Bertolet tied Southeastern Conference and school records by making six field goals against Vanderbilt. He tied Alan Smith's six field goals in 1983 against Arkansas State.

Professional career

Los Angeles Rams
After going undrafted in the 2016 NFL Draft, Bertolet signed with the Los Angeles Rams on May 4, 2016. On August 30, 2016, he was released by the Rams.

Denver Broncos
On March 21, 2018, Bertolet signed with the Denver Broncos. On April 30, 2018, he was waived by the Broncos.

New York Jets
On May 7, 2018, Bertolet was signed by the New York Jets. He was waived by the Jets on September 1, 2018, after losing the starting kicking job to Jason Myers.

Salt Lake Stallions
Before the 2019 season, Bertolet signed with the Salt Lake Stallions of the Alliance of American Football.

Denver Broncos (second stint)
After the AAF filed for bankruptcy, Bertolet re-signed with the Denver Broncos on April 29, 2019. He was waived on July 23, 2019.

New York Jets (second stint)
On August 11, 2019, Bertolet was signed by the New York Jets after Chandler Catanzaro retired during preseason. He was waived by the Jets on September 1, 2019.

Carolina Panthers
On October 24, 2020, Bertolet was signed to the Carolina Panthers practice squad. He was released on November 2, 2020, and re-signed to the practice squad on November 7. He was released again on November 10, and re-signed to the practice squad again on November 14. He was released on November 16, and re-signed again on November 21. Bertolet was released a fourth time on November 24, 2020, but re-signed four days later. He was released again on December 1, 2020.

Minnesota Vikings
On December 19, 2020, Bertolet was signed to the Minnesota Vikings' practice squad. His practice squad contract with the team expired after the season on January 11, 2021.

Hamilton Tiger-Cats
Bertolet signed with the Hamilton Tiger-Cats on June 29, 2021. He was released on November 15, 2021.

New Orleans Breakers
Bertolet signed with the New Orleans Breakers of the United States Football League on May 5, 2022.

Carolina Panthers (second stint)
Bertolet signed to the Carolina Panthers' practice squad on September 9, 2022. He was released on September 13.

Los Angeles Chargers
Bertolet was signed to the Los Angeles Chargers practice squad on October 6, 2022. On October 9, he was elevated to the active roster, and made his first 3 NFL field goals that day, over 6 years from the start of his pro career.

References

1993 births
Living people
American football placekickers
Carolina Panthers players
Denver Broncos players
Hamilton Tiger-Cats players
Los Angeles Chargers players
Los Angeles Rams players
Minnesota Vikings players
New Orleans Breakers (2022) players
New York Jets players
Players of American football from Pennsylvania
Salt Lake Stallions players
Sportspeople from Reading, Pennsylvania
Texas A&M Aggies football players